1st district may refer to:

Australia 

 1st Military District (Australia)

Austria 

 Innere Stadt, the first district in the city of Vienna
 Innere Stadt (Graz), the first district in the city of Graz

Hungary 

 2nd district of Budapest

Japan 
Aichi 1st district
Akita 1st district
Aomori 1st district
Chiba 1st district
Ehime 1st district
Fukui 1st district
Fukuoka 1st district
Gifu 1st district
Gunma 1st district
Hiroshima 1st district
Hokkaido 1st district
Hyogo 1st district
Ibaraki 1st district
Ishikawa 1st district
Iwate 1st district
Kagawa 1st district
Kagoshima 1st district
Kanagawa 1st district
Kochi 1st district
Kumamoto 1st district
Kyoto 1st district
Mie 1st district
Miyagi 1st district
Miyazaki 1st district
Nagano 1st district
Nagasaki 1st district
Nara 1st district
Niigata 1st district
Oita 1st district
Okayama 1st district
Okinawa 1st district
Osaka 1st district
Saga 1st district
Saitama 1st district
Shiga 1st district
Shimane 1st district
Shizuoka 1st district
Tochigi 1st district
Tokushima 1st district
Tokyo 1st district
Tottori 1st district
Toyama 1st district
Wakayama 1st district
Yamagata 1st district
Yamaguchi 1st district
Yamanashi 1st district

Poland 
 District of Opolian Silesia (1st district)

United States 
Alabama's 1st congressional district
Arizona's 1st congressional district
Arkansas's 1st congressional district
California's 1st congressional district
Colorado's 1st congressional district
Connecticut's 1st congressional district
Florida's 1st congressional district
Georgia's 1st congressional district
Hawaii's 1st congressional district
Idaho's 1st congressional district
Illinois's 1st congressional district
Indiana's 1st congressional district
Iowa's 1st congressional district
Kansas's 1st congressional district
Kentucky's 1st congressional district
Louisiana's 1st congressional district
Maine's 1st congressional district
Maryland's 1st congressional district
Massachusetts's 1st congressional district
Michigan's 1st congressional district
Minnesota's 1st congressional district
Mississippi's 1st congressional district
Missouri's 1st congressional district
Montana's 1st congressional district (from 2023)
Nebraska's 1st congressional district
Nevada's 1st congressional district
New Hampshire's 1st congressional district
New Jersey's 1st congressional district
New Mexico's 1st congressional district
New York's 1st congressional district
North Carolina's 1st congressional district
Ohio's 1st congressional district
Oklahoma's 1st congressional district
Oregon's 1st congressional district
Pennsylvania's 1st congressional district
Rhode Island's 1st congressional district
South Carolina's 1st congressional district
Tennessee's 1st congressional district
Texas's 1st congressional district
Utah's 1st congressional district
Virginia's 1st congressional district
Washington's 1st congressional district
West Virginia's 1st congressional district
Wisconsin's 1st congressional district